Austin Rex Harris (born 1995 or 1996), is an American politician from the state of Iowa.

Harris was born in Moulton, Iowa in 1995 or 1996. He resides there with his family.

Harris endorsed Nikki Haley for the 2024 Republican Party presidential primaries.

Electoral history
*incumbent

2022

References

Living people
1995 births
Farmers from Iowa
Republican Party members of the Iowa House of Representatives
People from Moulton, Iowa
21st-century American politicians